Liptena bia is a butterfly in the family Lycaenidae. It is found in Ghana, Ivory Coast, Liberia and Sierra Leone.

References

Butterflies described in 2008
Liptena